James Patrick Murray (December 29, 1919 – August 16, 1998) was an American  He worked at the Los Angeles Times from 1961 until his death in 1998, and his column was nationally syndicated.

Among his many achievements was winning the NSSA's Sportswriter of the Year award 14 times (12 of those consecutively). In 1990, he won a Pulitzer Prize for Commentary for his 1989 columns, and the Baseball Hall of Fame awarded him the J. G. Taylor Spink Award in 1987.

After he won the Pulitzer in 1990, Murray modestly said he thought the prize winner should have had "to bring down a government or expose major graft or give advice to prime ministers. Correctly quoting Los Angeles Dodgers manager Tommy Lasorda shouldn't merit a Pulitzer Prize." He was offered $1 million to join The National Sports Daily, but declined.

Career

Prior to his tenure with the Los Angeles Times, Murray was a writer and columnist for Sports Illustrated from 1953 to 1961 and Time magazine from 1948 to 1955. He was also a reporter for the Los Angeles Examiner from 1944 to 1948, the New Haven (CT) Register and The Hartford Times. A native of Hartford, Connecticut, Murray graduated from that city's Trinity College 

Murray was noted for his great, albeit occasionally caustic, sense of humor and ability to turn a phrase, including the following: he wrote of the Indianapolis 500 automobile race, "Gentlemen, start your coffins"; that baseball player Rickey Henderson "has a strike zone the size of Hitler's heart"; and that UCLA basketball coach John Wooden was "so square he was divisible by four."

Although eventually afflicted with blindness, Murray continued covering and writing about sports as long as he was able. He wrote a column from the Del Mar racetrack for the L.A. Times on the day before he died.

The Jim Murray Memorial Foundation, created in 1999 by Murray's widow, Linda McCoy-Murray, raises money for journalism scholarships for college journalists. Currently 31 universities participate annually in a national essay competition in which the winners receive $5,000.00 scholarships.

In 1964, he received the Golden Plate Award of the American Academy of Achievement.

He was inducted in the National Sportscasters and Sportswriters Association Hall of Fame in 1978.

In 1982, Murray was honored by the Associated Press Sports Editors, who awarded him the Red Smith Award, which is America's most prestigious sports writing honor. For his contribution to sports in Los Angeles, he was honored with a Los Angeles Memorial Coliseum "Court of Honor" plaque by the Coliseum commissioners. A testimonial dinner in Beverly Hills was held for Murray after he won his Pulitzer Prize in 1990, at which the guests included many show-business and sports luminaries, as well as Nancy and Ronald Reagan.

Murray's funeral, at St. Martin of Tours Catholic Church in Brentwood, was attended by a variety of notable sports figures including Marcus Allen, Elgin Baylor, Al Davis, Rafer Johnson, Chris McCarron, Peter O'Malley, Luc Robitaille, Bill Russell, Donald Sterling, Danny Sullivan, and Mike Tyson. The tribute was delivered by his longtime friend, sportscaster 

Murray is buried in Holy Cross Cemetery in Culver City; a Golden Palm Star on the Palm Springs Walk of Stars was dedicated posthumously to him in 2008.

Works 
 Jim Murray: The Autobiography (1995)

The following are collections of Jim Murray articles:
 The Jim Murray Reader (2011)
 Last of the Best (1998)
 The Great Ones (1991)
 The Jim Murray Collection (1988)
 The Best of Jim Murray

By other authors:
 Quotable Jim Murray: The Literary Wit, Wisdom, and Wonder of a Distinguished American Sports Columnist, by Linda McCoy-Murray (2003)

Notable quotes 

 On the Indianapolis 500 auto race: "Gentlemen, start your coffins."
 On Spokane, Washington: "The only trouble with Spokane is that there's nothing to do there after 10 o'clock. In the morning."
 On Oakland, California: "Oakland is this kind of town: You have to pay 50 cents to go from Oakland to San Francisco, but coming to Oakland from San Francisco is free."
 On San Francisco: "Its legacy to the world is quiche."
 On Cincinnati, Ohio: "They still haven't fixed the freeway. It's Kentucky's turn to use the cement mixer."
 On New Jersey: "Its principal export is soot."
 On Baltimore, Maryland: "Baltimore is a great place if you're a crab."
 On Minneapolis and St. Paul, Minnesota: "They didn't like each other and, from what I can see, I didn't blame either one of them."
 On Iowa visitors to the Rose Bowl: "thousands of people in calico and John Deere caps in their Winnebagos with their pacemakers and potato salad, looking for Bob Hope."
 On a Brookline, Massachusetts golf club: "I won't say this place is stuffy, but if you ever want to play here, bring your monocle."
 Los Angeles "is underpoliced and oversexed."
 Elgin Baylor "is as unstoppable as a woman's tears."
 Rickey Henderson "has a strike zone the size of Hitler's heart."
 John Wooden "is so square he's divisible by four."
 Roger Staubach "is as square as a piece of fudge."
 "Tommy Lasorda "is as noisy as a bowling alley."
 On Merlin Olsen: "He went swimming in Loch Ness and the monster got out."
 On Boog Powell: "They're going to make an umbrella stand out of his foot."
 On Billy Martin: "Some people have a chip on their shoulders. Billy has a lumberyard."
 On Sandy Koufax: "Sandy's fastball was so fast, some batters started to swing while he was on his way to the mound."
 On Reggie Jackson: "He didn't swing at a pitch, he pounced on it like a leopard coming out of a tree."
 On Maury Wills: "He studied pitchers the same way heist men studied banks. And for the same reason: larceny."
 On Steve Garvey: "He was the most controlled individual I have ever known in my life. He could make the Pope look temperamental."
 On Kirk Gibson: "If Reggie Jackson is Mr. October, Kirk Gibson is at least hey-what-about-me?"
 On Sonny Liston vs. Cassius Clay: "One hundred and eighty million people will be rooting for a double knockout."
 "Mike Tyson should be able to fight only a thing that can bite back."
 "Baseball is a game where a curve is an optical illusion, a screwball can be a pitch or a person, stealing is legal and you can spit anywhere you like except in the umpire's eye or on the ball."
 "Don Quixote would love golf. It's the impossible dream."

References

External links
Baseball Hall of Fame
California Sports Hall of Fame
Jim Murray Foundation

1919 births
1998 deaths
American columnists
American male journalists
Burials at Holy Cross Cemetery, Culver City
Writers from Hartford, Connecticut
Pulitzer Prize for Commentary winners
Sportswriters from California
Trinity College (Connecticut) alumni
BBWAA Career Excellence Award recipients
Red Smith Award recipients
20th-century American non-fiction writers
20th-century American male writers